The National Academy of Sports Medicine (NASM) is an American fitness training provider founded in 1987. Its headquarters is located in Gilbert, Arizona.

History
The original founder was Robert M. Goldman. NASM is a subsidiary of Ascend Learning. NASM members attend and conduct health and fitness conferences that provide networking opportunities, discussion, review and formation of the Association's certification requirements. NASM is accredited by the Institute for Credentialing Excellence. The organization is registered with the Better Business Bureau as a sole proprietorship. 

NASM's CEO is Micheal Clark, who joined NASM as a partner in 2000 and also serves as the physical therapist for the Phoenix Suns.

Educational partnerships

Successful completion of the National Personal Training Institute program allows the graduate to be eligible to take the NASM Certification examination.

Veterans and military
Since 2010, NASM has been listed as a Military Friendly School.

See also
Personal Trainer

References

External links
 

1987 establishments in Illinois
Organizations established in 1987
Health care-related professional associations based in the United States